Rule is a town in Haskell County, Texas, United States. The population was 636 at the 2010 census, down from 698 at the 2000 census.

The community was named for W. A. Rule, a railroad man.

Geography
Rule is in western Haskell County at the intersection of U.S. Route 380 and Texas State Highway 6. US 380 leads east  to Haskell, the county seat, and west  to Old Glory, while Highway 6 leads north  to Rochester and south  to Stamford.

Climate
The climate in this area is characterized by hot, humid summers and generally mild to cool winters.  According to the Köppen climate classification system, Rule has a humid subtropical climate, Cfa on climate maps.

Demographics

2020 census

As of the 2020 United States census, there were 561 people, 347 households, and 173 families residing in the town.

2000 census
As of the census of 2000, there were 698 people, 300 households, and 207 families residing in the town. The population density was 1,003.4 people per square mile (385.0/km2). There were 386 housing units at an average density of 554.9 per square mile (212.9/km2). The racial makeup of the town was 87.82% White, 2.15% African American, 0.14% Native American, 7.31% from other races, and 2.58% from two or more races. Hispanic or Latino of any race were 19.34% of the population.

There were 300 households, out of which 27.7% had children under the age of 18 living with them, 59.0% were married couples living together, 8.3% had a female householder with no husband present, and 30.7% were non-families. 28.7% of all households were made up of individuals, and 19.3% had someone living alone who was 65 years of age or older. The average household size was 2.33 and the average family size was 2.87.

In the town, the population was spread out, with 24.6% under the age of 18, 4.6% from 18 to 24, 21.2% from 25 to 44, 23.6% from 45 to 64, and 25.9% who were 65 years of age or older. The median age was 45 years. For every 100 females, there were 93.4 males. For every 100 females age 18 and over, there were 85.9 males.

The median income for a household in the town was $24,342, and the median income for a family was $30,069. Males had a median income of $22,708 versus $14,167 for females. The per capita income for the town was $14,454. About 14.3% of families and 19.8% of the population were below the poverty line, including 25.4% of those under age 18 and 15.3% of those age 65 or over.

Education
The Town of Rule is served by the Rule Independent School District and Rule High School.

Notable people
Art Briles, football coach and player
Wes Kittley, head coach of the Texas Tech Red Raiders track and field team

References

External links
 Handbook of Texas Online

Towns in Haskell County, Texas
Towns in Texas